Olga Merediz (born February 15, 1956) is an American actress and singer. Merediz originated the role of Abuela Claudia in the Broadway musical In the Heights, for which she received a Tony Award nomination for Best Performance by a Featured Actress in a Musical. She played the role for the show's entire Broadway run, and reprised the role in the film adaptation. Her television credits include NBC's 2016 series Shades of Blue and Netflix's Orange Is the New Black.

Early life
Merediz was born in Guantánamo, Cuba on February 15, 1956. She left Cuba with her family when she was five years old to Miami, Florida. Thereafter, she relocated with her family to Puerto Rico where she grew up. Merediz graduated with a bachelor's degree from Newcomb College, the former female counterpart to Tulane University in New Orleans, Louisiana.

Career

Film and television
Having made her film debut in 1984's The Brother from Another Planet, Merediz has since appeared in a number of films, including The Milagro Beanfield War (1988), City of Hope (1991), Evita (1996), Music of the Heart (1999), K-Pax (2001), Remember Me (2010), Custody (2016), Humor Me (2017), and the reprise of her 2008 Tony Award nominated Broadway role as Abuela Claudia, in the film adaptation In the Heights (2021). She also portrayed Alma Madrigal in Encanto (2021). 

Her television credits, in both dramas and comedies, include recurring and guest roles in Diary of a Future President, New Amsterdam, Brooklyn Nine-Nine, Orange Is the New Black and Madam Secretary. She has been a series regular in the UK television series Bounty Hunters and the comedy Saint George, has appeared in episodes of both Law & Order and Law & Order: SVU, and appeared as herself as a judge on Throwdown with Bobby Flay.

Theatre and stage
In addition to In the Heights, her Broadway credits include Reckless at the Manhattan Theatre Club, Man of La Mancha, and Les Misérables. She also appeared as Rosie in Mamma Mia!.

Before they went to Broadway, Merediz starred in the Off-Broadway versions of In the Heights, and The Human Comedy. Some of her other Off-Broadway credits include Women without Men, The Haggadah, Lullabye and Goodnight, and The Blessing.

Additionally, Merediz was directed by John Cassavetes in a play called Thornhill.

Voice-over credits
Merediz has an extensive voice-over and narration portfolio, including the PBS Nature documentaries: Bears, Hotel Armadillo, Jungle Animal Hospital, Nature's Miracle Orphans, and Cuba: The Accidental Eden. Her voice can be heard in numerous TV/radio commercials, Dora the Explorer, Go, Diego, Go!, Elena of Avalor, and Encanto.

She served as spokesperson for the MTA, New York City Transit Authority.

Awards and nominations
At the 2008 Tony Awards, she received a nomination for Best Performance by a Featured Actress in a Musical for the Broadway incarnation of In the Heights. In addition to her Tony Award nomination, Merediz won a 2007 Drama Desk Award for Outstanding Ensemble Performance for her role in the off-Broadway run of In the Heights, as well as a 2003 HOLA Tespis Award from the Hispanic Organization of Latin Actors.

In 2013, Latina magazine named her as one of the 50 Best Latin Singers and Pop Stars of All Time. According to the magazine, "The Cuban Broadway star knows how to dominate a live stage and owns it!"

Filmography

Film

Television

Stage

Discography

Charted songs

References

External links
 
 Olga Merediz at the Internet Off-Broadway Database

1956 births
Cuban emigrants to the United States
Living people
Hispanic and Latino American women singers
American musical theatre actresses
American television actresses
American voice actresses
21st-century American women
H. Sophie Newcomb Memorial College alumni